Rockliffe is a British television police procedural drama series, produced by the BBC, which ran for three series between 9 January 1987 and 14 December 1988. Rockliffe was devised by Richard O'Keeffe, and produced by Leonard Lewis. The first two series, entitled Rockliffe's Babies, starred Ian Hogg as Alan Rockliffe, a detective sergeant assigned to train a team of inexperienced plain-clothed Crime Squad PCs in inner-city London, which include Steve Hood (Brett Fancy), Gerry O'Dowd (Joe McGann), David Adams (Bill Champion), Janice Hargreaves (Alphonsia Emmanuel), Paul Georgiou (Martyn Ellis), Keith Chitty (John Blakely) and Karen Walsh (Susanna Shelling). The series featured writing contributions from Richard O`Keeffe, Don Webb, Charlie Humphreys and Nick Perry, and was directed by Derek Lister, Keith Washington, Clive Fleury and David Attwood.

The third series, entitled Rockliffe's Folly, followed Rockliffe through his relocation to Wessex Police, dealing with rural crimes as part of a new team of investigators. The seven episode third series proved to be the last, with many citing a change in the programme's formula for the heavy decline in viewing figures. Many viewers stated that the success of the two Babies series came not from Rockliffe himself, but from the popular ensemble cast. Most of the location filming featured in the first two series took place around the Kensal Rise area of West London. Notably, the police station interiors were at Canalot Studios, Kensal Road. A paperback novel was released as a tie-in to the first series on 11 December 1986, four weeks before the broadcast of the first episode. After many years of remaining unreleased, the first two series have been earmarked for release on DVD by Network distributing on 8 May 2017.

Cast
 Ian Hogg as DS Alan Rockliffe

Rockliffe's Babies
 Bill Champion as PC David Adams
 John Blakey as PC Keith Chitty
 Brett Fancy as PC Steve Hood
 Joe McGann as PC Gerry O'Dowd
 Martyn Ellis as PC Paul Georgiou
 Susanna Shelling as WPC Karen Walsh
 Alphonsia Emmanuel as WPC Janice Hargreaves
 Brian Croucher as Chief Superintendent Barry Wyatt
 Bill McCabe as Sergeant Benyon
 Edward Wilson as DI Charlie Flight
 Malcolm Terris as Detective Superintendent Munro

Rockliffe's Folly
 James Aubrey as DI Derek Hoskins
 Ian Brimble as Inspector Leslie Yaxley
 Aaron Harris DC Paul Whitmore
 Carole Nimmons as Sergeant Rachel Osborne
 Craig Nightingale as PC Guy Overton
 Elizabeth Henry as WPC Hester Goswell
 John Hartley as PC Alfred Duggan

Episodes

Series 1: Rockliffe's Babies (1987)

Series 2: Rockliffe's Babies 2 (1988)

Series 3: Rockliffe's Folly (1988)

References

External links
 
 

1987 British television series debuts
1988 British television series endings
BBC television dramas
1980s British crime television series
1980s British drama television series
English-language television shows